Pocahontas County High School is a public high school located in Dunmore, West Virginia, United States. It serves 352 students in grades 9-12. Pocahontas County High School opened in 1968; it replaced Green Bank High School, Hillsboro High School, and Marlinton High School.

Athletics
Pocahontas County High School participates in athletics under the nickname Warriors. It competes in class A of the West Virginia Secondary School Activities Commission.

References

External links

Greatschools.net - Pocahontas County High School

Educational institutions established in 1968
Public high schools in West Virginia
Education in Pocahontas County, West Virginia
Buildings and structures in Pocahontas County, West Virginia